Lumbovsky Bay (Lumbovsky zaliv) is an inlet of the White Sea. It is the largest inlet along the Tersky Coast of the Kola Peninsula.

References

Bays of Murmansk Oblast
Bays of the White Sea